Charles Otis Warren (born June 21, 1975) is an American professional golfer.

Warren won the NCAA Division I Championship in 1997 while attending Clemson University.

Warren was a member of the Web.com Tour in 1998 (Nike Tour), 2000–2004 and 2011–2012 (Nationwide Tour), and a member of the PGA Tour in 1999 and 2005–2010.

Amateur wins
1997 NCAA Division I Championship

Professional wins (4)

Nationwide Tour wins (3)

Tour de las Américas wins (1)
2003 Panama Open

Results in major championships

Note: Warren never played in the Masters Tournament nor The Open Championship.

CUT = missed the half-way cut
"T" = tied

U.S. national team appearances
Amateur
Palmer Cup: 1997 (winners)

See also
1998 PGA Tour Qualifying School graduates
2004 Nationwide Tour graduates

External links

American male golfers
Clemson Tigers men's golfers
PGA Tour golfers
Korn Ferry Tour graduates
Golfers from South Carolina
Sportspeople from Columbia, South Carolina
1975 births
Living people